Access:d is a live album by the band Delirious?.

Track listing

Disc one
 "Access:d Part 1 (Touch)" (Martin Smith, Stuart Garrard) – 1:44
 "Deeper" (Smith, Garrard) – 4:19
 "God's Romance" (Smith) – 5:54
 "My Glorious" (Smith, Garrard) – 6:22
 "Access:d Part 2 (Blindfold)" (Smith) – 4:00
 "Love Is The Compass" (Smith, Garrard) – 3:52
 "Touch" (Smith, Garrard) – 5:03
 "Access:d Part 3 (Rain Down)" (Smith, Garrard) – 4:21
 "Follow" (Smith, Garrard) – 4:35
 "Happy Song" (Smith) – 3:37
 "Heaven" (Smith, Garrard) – 4:55
 "History Maker" (Smith) – 8:40

Disc two
 "Bliss" (Smith, Garrard) – 4:33
 "Show Me Heaven" (Smith, Garrard) – 3:15
 "Sanctify" (Garrard, Smith) – 4:43
 "I Could Sing Of Your Love Forever" (Smith) – 4:27
 "Take Me Away" (Smith, Garrard) – 3:37
 "Fire" (Smith, Garrard) – 3:56
 "Everything" (Smith, Garrard) – 4:54
 "King of Fools" (Garrard, Smith) – 3:23
 "Jesus' Blood" (Smith) – 4:35
 "Hang On To You" (Smith) – 5:50
 "Access:d Part 4 (If We'd Ask)" (Kevin Prosch) – 1:45
 "Access:d Part 5 (Dance In The River)" (Smith) – 3:05
 "Access:d Part 6 (Lord You Have My Heart)" (Smith) – 2:27
 "Investigate" (Smith, Garrard) – 8:12

Release history

References

Delirious? albums
2002 live albums